Holly Norton (born 1 January 1993) is a South African–British rower.

Biography
Born and raised in Harare, Zimbabwe, Holly's family moved to South Africa in 2003. It was at St Stithians Girl's College that she first took up rowing.

She was part of the British team that topped the medal table at the 2015 World Rowing Championships at Lac d'Aiguebelette in France, where she won a silver medal as part of the coxless four with Rebecca Chin, Karen Bennett and Lucinda Gooderham. She won the gold medal in the coxless four at the 2016 World Rowing Championships with Donna Etiebet, Holly Nixon and Fiona Gammond.

Norton formerly represented South Africa as a junior rower. She rowed collegiately for the Ohio State Buckeyes, and helped the team to three consecutive NCAA national championship titles in 2013, 2014 and 2015. She currently rows for the Leander Club.

References

External links 
 
 Holly Norton at British Rowing
 Profile of Holly Norton on Rowing Classifieds

Living people
1993 births
British female rowers
South African female rowers
World Rowing Championships medalists for Great Britain
Ohio State Buckeyes rowers
Alumni of St Stithians College